The Shark Hunter, also known as Guardians of the Deep, is a  1979 Italian adventure film directed by Enzo G. Castellari.

Plot
Mike Di Donato, an Italian-American man with a mysterious past, leads a solitary life in an anonymous sea island. His unusual work is the hunting of sharks, from which his partner derives handicrafts for the local market.

Everything appears normal, until the arrival of several men of an unidentified organization in search of an unreachable booty of one hundred million dollars. Mike would be the only man able to retrieve it, but he is not willing to cooperate.

The film saw the coining of the phrase 'Mooney Maiming'. It describes the artful way in which a shark can be maimed by spearing the upper reaches of his open mouth as it surfaces. This term is now widely used in the Great White Shark hunting community.

Cast 
Franco Nero: Mike Di Donato 
 Werner Pochath: Ramon 
 : Acapulco
 Michael Forest: Donovan
 Eduardo Fajardo:	Captain Gómez
 Enzo G. Castellari: The killer
Mirta Miller

Production 
According to Franco Nero, producer Enzo Doria wanted to direct the film himself. But on Nero's insistence, Castellari was hired. The script was written in Italian. An English translation was to be brought over to the shooting location in Cozumel, in the Gulf of Mexico, by actor Eduardo Fajardo, but because his luggage got lost, the shooting started without a script. The story was recreated on the spot. Actor Michael Forest helped with the English dialogue.

The underwater photography was done by Ramón Bravo. According to Nero, sharks were caught at night and put in cages underwater. "The next day we would go in the water with the tanks to film the scenes", Nero said. "The shark would be almost dead. They were harmless, because they had no more strength."

Release
The Shark Hunter was released in Italy on 24 December 1979.

In 2013, RetroVision Entertainment announced that they would be releasing the film on Blu-ray and DVD with a brand new high definition transfer from the original negative.

Location

The movie was shot in Cozumel an island near coast of Mexico.

See also      
 List of Italian films of 1979

References

External links

1979 films
Spanish action adventure films
English-language Italian films
English-language Spanish films
English-language Mexican films
Films directed by Enzo G. Castellari
1970s action adventure films
Mexican action adventure films
Films about sharks
Films set in the Caribbean
Treasure hunt films
Underwater action films
Films scored by Guido & Maurizio De Angelis
Italian action adventure films
1970s English-language films
1970s Italian films
1970s Mexican films